Pierre Berton (1920–2004) was a Canadian author of non-fiction and a well-known television personality and journalist.

Pierre Berton is also the name of:

Pierre Berton (playwright) (1842–1912), 19th century playwright, co-author of the play Zaza
Pierre Montan Berton (1727–1780), French composer and father of composer Henri Montan Berton

See also 
 Pierre Bertin (1891–1984), French stage and film actor